Alves dos Santos and dos Santos Alves are a combined surname, may refer to:

Sports people
Tatiana Alves dos Santos Brazilian volleyball player

Football (soccer) players
Caio César Alves dos Santos (1986)
Claudiano "Diano" Alves dos Santos (1981)
Jaílson Alexandre Alves dos Santos (1981)
Rafael Alves dos Santos (1984)
Heleno dos Santos Alves (1978) Brazilian football (soccer) player

Other persons
Rui Baltazar dos Santos Alves, revolutionary Mozambican politician and university rector

See also
Alves da Silva